The MTV Millennial Awards (commonly abbreviated as a MIAW) is an annual program of Latin American music awards, presented by the cable channel MTV Latin America to honor the best of Latin music and the digital world of the millennial generation. The ceremony has been held in Mexico City since its first edition on July 16, 2013. In 2020 there was no ceremony due to the COVID-19 pandemic.

List of ceremonies

Award categories

Current award categories
Music
 Video of the Year
 Hit of the Year (awarded as Catchiest Hit of the Year in 2013) 
 Best Pop Artist (awarded as Pop Explosion of the Year)
 International Hit of the Year
 Party Anthem
 Best DJ (awarded as Beat Guru)
 Argentine Artist of the Year
 Colombian Artist of the Year
 Mexican Artist of the Year
 Collaboration of the Year
Digital
 MIAW Icon of the Year (awarded as Digitial Icon of the Year until 2016)
 Best New Artist (awarded as The Newest Face)
 Best Worldwide Instagrammer (2014-2015, 2017–present)
 Best Argentine Instagrammer (2013, 2017–present)
 Best Colombian Instagrammer (2013, 2017–present)
 Best Mexican Instagrammer
 Best Performance in an App
 Celebrity Challenge
 Instacrush (awarded as Bizcocho of the Year in 2013 and Sexiest Millennial in 2014)
 Instacrack (2013-2015, 2017–present, awarded as Bombón of the Year in 2013 and Hottest Millennial in 2014)
 Supercolab
 Digital Addiction of the Year
 Ridiculous of the Year (awarded as Epicfail in 2014 and 2015)
 Viral Bomba
Miscellaneous
 Film of the Year
 Series of the Year (2013, 2015–present)
 Videogame of the Year (awarded as Legendary Game; 2013–2014, 2017–present)
 Pranker of the Year
 Perfect Match
 Styler of the Year
 Best Parody
 Lord & Ladies
 Mami Acashore
 Papi Acashore

Past award categories
 Buzz Artist (2015–2016)
 Gamer Master (2015–2016)
 Best Argentine Snapchatter (2016)
 Best Colombian Snapchatter (2016)
 Best Mexican Snapchatter (2016)
 Twitstar of the Year (2013, 2015; awards for individual regions were created in 2015)
 Viner of the Year (2015)
 Celebrity Dubsmash (2015)
 Couple on Fire (2015)
 Best Latin Instagrammer (2014; awards for individual regions were created in 2015)
 Best Instagrammer (2013; awards for individual regions were created in 2014)
 Argentine Twitstar of the Year (2014)
 Colombian Twitstar of the Year (2014)
 Mexican Twitstar of the Year (2014)
 Best Athlete (2013)
 Social Network of the Year (2013)
 Best Instagrammer (2013)
 Best Fan Army (2013)

Most wins

Most nominations

See also
 MTV Video Music Awards
 MTV Europe Music Awards
 MTV Movie & TV Awards
 MTV Video Music Brasil
 Los Premios MTV Latinoamérica
 MTV Millennial Awards Brazil

References

International music awards
Latin music awards
Awards established in 2013
Spanish-language music